Boncuk Makbule Yılmaz (born 13 May 1981) is a Turkish actress.

Life and career 
Yılmaz is a graduate of Anadolu University School of Communication. She was discovered by director Ahmet Uluçay, and in 2004 made her debut with the movie Karpuz Kabuğundan Gemiler Yapmak. With her role in this movie, she received the "Hope-giving Young Actress Award" at the 26th SİYAD Turkish Cinema Awards. After the movie's success, she was offered roles in TV series such as Kızlar Yurdu, Sıla and Haneler. She won nationwide fame with her role in the series Çukur.

In May 2013, she married actor Fethi Kantarcı, with whom she has a child.

Filmography

Film 
 Karpuz Kabuğundan Gemiler Yapmak (Nihal) 2004
 Sessiz Gece 2005
 Kızlar Yurdu 2006
 Kader Postası 2019

Television 
 Sıla (Narin) 2006 
 Haneler 2009
 Mazi Kalbimde Yaradır 2011
 Bir Yastıkta 2013
 Böyle Bitmesin 2013
 Çukur (Saadet) 2017–2021
 Another Self (Sevgi) 2022
 Ateş Kuşları (Nazmiye) 2023–

References

External links 
 
 

Living people
1981 births
Turkish film actresses
Turkish television actresses
Turkish stage actresses
Actresses from Istanbul